Heinrich Weber (9 October 1901 – 6 January 1970) was a German composer and organist.

Life 
Born in Cologne, Weber studied first in Aachen and later at the Musikhochschule Köln. There, among others, his teachers were Hans Bachem (organ) and Heinrich Lemacher (harmony and theory).

Weber, meanwhile appointed Kirchenmusikdirektor of Mülheim, was regarded as an outstanding interpreter, especially of French organ music, and gained an excellent reputation as an improviser.

Weber was a member of the Reichsverband der katholischen Kirchenangestellten e. V. in Essen. Together with this association, Weber organized a study trip to Paris in 1956, where he gave the members the opportunity to meet Marcel Dupré and Rolande Falcinelli and to gain insight into the French organ art. Furthermore, Weber contributed to the organ book for the Roman Catholic Archdiocese of Cologne. His organ compositions were only partially published, however, and are preserved in the musicological institute of the University of Cologne. 

Weber died in Aachen at the age of 68.

Work 
 Praeludium und Choralfuge f-moll op. 9/1
 Choralvorspiele für Orgel op. 10
 Haec dies - Toccata für Orgel op. 12
 Passacaglia e-moll
 Preaeludium und Doppelfuge fis-moll
 Choral, Variations et Fantaisie über "Es führt drei König Gottes Hand"
 1. Orgelsonate
 2. Orgelsonate in D
 3. Orgelsonate
 Fünf Stücke für Orgel (Verlag Böhm)
 Praeludium, Aria und Fuge über ein eigenes Thema (manuscript)
 Choralvorspiel über "O Maria, Gnadenvolle" (manuscript)
 Choralvorspiel über "Ave Maria Kaiserin" (manuscript)
 Festmesse in D für vierstimmig gemischten Chor und Orgel oder Bläser

Further reading 
 Heinrich Lemacher: Kirchenmusikdirektor Heinrich Weber, in musica sacra, die Zeitschrift für katholische Kirchenmusik, issue 11/1964,

References

External links 
 
 Porträt auf den Seiten des Erzbistums Köln, Stifts-Chor Bonn
 Vorliegendes Notenmaterial Schwann Verlag (now Edition Peters)

1901 births
1970 deaths
Musicians from Cologne
German organists
20th-century classical composers
20th-century German composers
Kirchenmusikdirektor